The 2018 Australian motorcycle Grand Prix was the seventeenth round of the 2018 MotoGP season. It was held at the Phillip Island Grand Prix Circuit in Phillip Island on 28 October 2018.

Classification

MotoGP

 Cal Crutchlow suffered a broken ankle in a crash during practice and withdrew from the event.

Moto2

 Stefano Manzi suffered a wrist injury in a crash during qualifying and withdrew from the event.

Moto3

 Kazuki Masaki suffered a broken left hand in a crash during practice and withdrew from the event.

Championship standings after the race
Bold text indicates the World Champions.

MotoGP

Moto2

Moto3

Notes

References

Australia
Motorcycle Grand Prix
Australian motorcycle Grand Prix
Australian motorcycle Grand Prix
Motorsport at Phillip Island